Mladen Cukon (born 21 March 1946) is a former Croatian football player.

Club career
Born in Pula, as a player he spent much of his career playing in Rijeka for NK Orijent and HNK Rijeka. He also had a short and unsuccessful spell with Dinamo Zagreb playing only one game. Afterwards, he had two stints with Toronto Metros-Croatia in 1976 and 1977, also playing for NK Osijek between the two spells in Canada.

References

1947 births
Living people
Sportspeople from Pula
Association football defenders
Yugoslav footballers
HNK Orijent players
GNK Dinamo Zagreb players
HNK Rijeka players
Toronto Blizzard (1971–1984) players
NK Osijek players
Yugoslav First League players
North American Soccer League (1968–1984) players
Yugoslav expatriate footballers
Expatriate soccer players in Canada
Yugoslav expatriate sportspeople in Canada